Zama Lake Airport formerly  was a registered aerodrome located near to both Zama Lake and Zama City, Alberta, Canada.

See also
Zama Airport

References

External links
Page about this airport on COPA's Places to Fly airport directory

Defunct airports in Alberta
Mackenzie County